The serpent is a low-pitched early brass instrument developed in the Renaissance era with a trombone-like mouthpiece and tone holes (later with keys) like a woodwind instrument. It is named for its long, conical bore bent into a snakelike shape, and unlike most brass instruments is generally made from wood, usually walnut, and covered with dark brown or black leather. A distant ancestor of the tuba, the serpent is related to the cornett and was used for bass parts from the 17th to the early 19th centuries.

Characteristics

Although closely related to the cornett, the serpent has thinner walls, a more conical bore, and no thumb-hole. The serpent is typically built in eight-foot C with six fingerholes, in two groups of three. Early serpents were keyless, while later instruments added keys for additional holes out of reach of the fingers, to improve intonation and extend range.

There is no real standard for the serpent's range, which varies according to the instrument and the player, but typically covers from around C two octaves below middle C to at least G above middle C, sometimes higher. The sound of a serpent is somewhere between a bassoon and a euphonium, and it is typically played in a seated position, with the instrument resting upright on the player's thighs.

History
There is little direct material or documentary evidence for the exact origin of the serpent. Historian Jean Lebeuf claimed in his 1743 work Mémoires Concernant l'Histoire Ecclésiastique et Civile d’Auxerre that the serpent was invented in 1590 by Edmé Guillaume, a clergyman in Auxerre, France. Although this account is often accepted, some scholars suppose instead that the serpent evolved from the large, S-shaped bass cornetts that were in use in Italy in the 16th century. It was certainly used in France since the early 17th century to strengthen the cantus firmus and bass voices of choirs in plainchant.
Around the middle of the 18th century, the serpent began to appear in chamber ensembles, and later in orchestras. Mozart used two serpents in the orchestra for his 1771 opera Ascanio in Alba.

Military serpents 
Towards the end of the 18th century, the increased popularity of the serpent in military bands drove the subsequent development of the instrument to accommodate marching or mounted players. In England, a distinct military serpent was developed which had a more compact shape with tighter curves, added extra keys to improve its intonation, and metal braces between the bends to increase its rigidity and durability.
In France around the same time several makers produced a  initially developed by Piffault (by whose name they are also known) that arranges the tubing vertically with an upward turned bell, reminiscent of a tenor saxophone.

Upright serpents and bass horns 

Several vertical configurations of the serpent, generally known as upright serpents or bass horns, sprung up in the early 19th century. Retaining the same fingering and six tone holes of the original serpent, the layouts of these instruments more resemble that of a bassoon, with jointed straight tubes that fit into a short U-shaped butte joint, and an upward pointing bell.

The name is possibly a corruption of  since they were taken up by the Prussian army bands of the time. These instruments were built mostly in Lyon and often had the buccin-style decorative zoomorphic bells popular in France at the time, shaped and painted like a dragon or serpent head.

The English bass horn, developed by Frenchman Louis Frichot in London in 1799, had an all-metal V-shaped construction, described by Felix Mendelssohn as looking like a watering can. He admired its sound however, and wrote for it in several of his works, including his fifth symphony and the overture to A Midsummer Night's Dream.

In Paris in 1823, Forveille invented his eponymous , an upright serpent with an enlarged bell section influenced by the (then newly invented) ophicleide. It is distinguished by being made from wood, brass tubing being used only for the leadpipe and first bend. It became popular in bands for its improved intonation and sound quality. In 1828 Jean-Baptiste Coëffet patented his ophimonocleide ("snake with one key"), one of the last innovations of the upright serpent. It solved one of the serpent's perennial problems, its difficult and indistinct B♮ notes, by building the instrument a semitone lower in B♮ but adding a large open tone hole that keeps the instrument in C until its key is pressed, closing the tone hole and producing a B♮ that is clear and resonant.

In Italy it was replaced by the cimbasso, a loose term that referred to several instruments; initially an upright serpent similar to the basson russe, then the ophicleide, and finally by the time of Verdi's later operas such as Otello (1887), a valve contrabass trombone.

The era of upright serpents was brief, spanning the first half of the 19th century from their invention to their replacement by the ophicleide and the subsequent invention of instruments using brass instrument valves. Richard Wagner used a serpent as a third bassoon in his 1840 opera Rienzi, but by the 1869 première of his Der Ring des Nibelungen cycle he was writing his lowest brass parts for tuba and contrabass trombone.

Contemporary performance 

Although not as popular as they were in the past, serpents are still made today by specialist instrument makers, and in modern usage the instrument is used from time-to-time in film scores, as well as in chamber ensembles that feature period instruments. Bernard Herrmann used a serpent in the scores of White Witch Doctor (1953) and Journey to the Center of the Earth (1959), as did Jerry Goldsmith in his score for Alien (1979).

Modern works for the instrument include Simon Proctor's 1987 "Serpent Concerto", which was commissioned to mark the first International Serpent Festival, Norman Bolter's work "Temptation" for serpent and string quartet, written for player Douglas Yeo and premiered at the 1999 International Trombone Festival in Potsdam, New York, and Luigi Morleo's "Diversità: NO LIMIT", a concerto for serpent and strings which premiered in Monopoli, Italy in 2012. Comic composer Peter Shickele also wrote a novelty P.D.Q. Bach piece for the London Serpent Trio and vocal ensemble entitled "O Serpent" in 1989.

Players
Michel Godard, jazz musician and tubist, who also plays the serpent
Douglas Yeo, professional trombone player, who also plays the serpent and ophicleide

See also
Rackett
Cornett

References

External links

The Serpent Website – an excellent reference for everything Serpent-related. Complete and detailed.
Complete Program Notes for "Le Monde du Serpent" – the story of Douglas Yeo's discovery of the Serpent and the recording of his 2003 solo Serpent CD.
Christopher Monk Instruments – Serpents and many other historical brass instruments are made here.
Contrabass Serpent – a page devoted to the c. 1840 Contrabass Serpent in the Edinburgh University Collection of Historic Musical Instruments.
The London Serpent Trio
serpent.instrument – Serpent French website by Volny Hostiou – research and information about church serpent

Brass instruments
Early musical instruments
Horns
Baroque instruments
Basso continuo instruments
Orchestral instruments